VY Canis Majoris (abbreviated to VY CMa) is an extreme oxygen-rich (O-rich) red hypergiant (RHG) or red supergiant (RSG) and pulsating variable star  from the Solar System in the slightly southern constellation of Canis Major. It is one of the largest known stars, one of the most luminous and massive red supergiants, and one of the most luminous stars in the Milky Way.

No evidence has been found that it is part of a multiple star system. Its great infrared (IR) excess makes it one of the brightest objects in the local part of the galaxy at wavelengths of 5 to 20 microns (µm) and indicates a dust shell or heated disk. It is about  times the mass of the Sun. It is surrounded by a complex asymmetric circumstellar envelope (CSE) caused by its mass loss. It produces strong molecular maser emission and was one of the first radio masers discovered.

The radius of VY CMa is very roughly 1,420 times that of the Sun, which is close to the modelled maximum, the Hayashi limit, a volume nearly 3 billion times that of the Sun. Taking this mid-point estimate as correct, an object travelling at the speed of light would take 6 hours to go around its surface, compared to 14.5 seconds for the Sun. If this star replaced the Sun its surface would, per this approximation, be beyond the orbit of Jupiter.

Observational history

The first known-recorded observation of VY Canis Majoris is in the star catalogue of the French astronomer Jérôme Lalande in 1801, which lists it as a 7th order of magnitude star. Further quite frequent studies of its apparent magnitude imply the light of the star as viewed from Earth has faded since 1850, which could be due to emission changes or a denser part of its surrounds becoming interposed (extinction).
Since 1847, VY Canis Majoris has been described as a crimson star. During the 19th century, observers measured at least six discrete components, suggesting that it might be a multiple star. These are now known to be bright zones in the host nebula. Observations in 1957 and high-resolution imaging in 1998 all but rule out any companion stars.

The variation in the star's brightness was first described in 1931, when it was listed (in German) as a long-period variable with a photographic magnitude range of 9.5 to 11.5. It was given the variable star designation VY Canis Majoris in 1939, the 43rd variable star of the constellation Canis Major.

Surroundings

This nebula is so bright that it was discovered in a dry night sky in 1917 with an 18 cm telescope, and its condensations were once regarded as companion stars. It has been extensively studied with the aid of the Hubble Space Telescope (HST), showing that the nebula has a complex structure that includes filaments and arcs, which were caused by past eruptions; the structure is akin to that around post-red supergiant (Post-RSG) or yellow hypergiant (YHG) IRC +10420. The similarity has led at least two professional articles to propose a model that the star might evolve blueward on the Hertzsprung–Russell diagram (HR diagram) to become a yellow hypergiant, then a luminous blue variable (LBV), and finally a Wolf–Rayet star (WR star).

Combining data from the mentioned telescope with others from the Keck in Hawaii it was possible to make a three-dimensional reconstruction of the envelope of the star. This reconstruction showed that the star's mass loss is much more complex than expected for any red supergiant or hypergiant. It became clear that the bows and nodules appeared at different times; the jets are randomly oriented, which prompts suspicion they derive from explosions of active parts of the photosphere. The spectroscopy proves the jets move away from the star at different speeds, confirming multiple events and directions as with coronal mass ejections. Multiple asymmetric mass loss events and the ejection of the outermost material are deduced to have occurred within the last 500 to 1,000 years, while that of a knot near the star would be less than 100 years. The mass loss is due to strong convection in the tenuous outer layers of the star, associated with magnetic fields. Ejections are analogous to—but much larger than—coronal ejections of the Sun.

Distance

In 1976, Lada and Reid published observations of the bright-rimmed molecular cloud Sh2-310, which is 15″ east of the star. At its edge bordered by the bright rim, an abrupt decrease in the CO emission and an increase in brightness of the  emission were observed, indicating possible destruction of molecular material and enhanced heating at the cloud-rim interface, respectively. They assumed the distance of the cloud is approximately equal to that of the stars, which are members of the open cluster NGC 2362, that ionize the rim. This star is projected onto the tip of the cloud rim, strongly suggesting its association. Furthermore, all the vectors of velocity of Sh2-310 are very close to those of the star. There is thus a near-certain physical association of the star with Sh2-310 and with NGC 2362 in all standard models.

Melnik and others later prefer a range centred on 1.2 kiloparsecs (about 3,900 light-years).

Distances can be calculated by measuring the change in position against very distant background objects as the telescope orbits the Sun. Parallax can be measured to high accuracy from the observation of masers using a long baseline interferometry. These imply the cloud (Sh2-310) is less remote than thought or that the star is a foreground object.

Variability

VY Canis Majoris is a variable star that varies from an apparent visual magnitude of 9.6 at minimum brightness to a magnitude of 6.5 at maximum with an estimated pulsational period of 956 days. In the General Catalogue of Variable Stars (GCVS) it is classed a semiregular variable of sub-type SRc, indicating a cool supergiant, although it is classed as a type LC slow irregular variable star in the American Association of Variable Star Observers (AAVSO) Variable Star Index. Other periods of 1,600 and 2,200 days have been derived.

VY CMa is sometimes considered as the prototype for a class of heavily mass-losing OH/IR supergiants, distinct from the more common asymptotic giant branch OH/IR stars.

Spectrum
The spectrum of VY Canis Majoris is that of a high-luminosity M-class star. The hydrogen lines, however, have P Cygni profiles fit for luminous blue variables. The spectrum is dominated by TiO bands whose strengths suggest a classification of M5. The H-alpha (Hα) line is not visible yet and there are unusual emission lines of neutral elements such as sodium and calcium. The luminosity class as determined from different spectral features varies from bright giant (II) to bright supergiant (Ia), with a compromise being given: as M5eIbp. Old classifications were confused by the interpretation of surrounding nebulosity as companion stars.

The present spectral classification system is inadequate to this star's complexities. The class depends on which of its complex spectral features are stressed. Further, key facets vary over time as to this star. It is cooler and thus redder than M2, and is usually classified between M3 and M5. A class as extreme as M2.5 appeared in a study of 2006. The luminosity class is likewise confused and often given only as I, partly because luminosity classes are poorly defined in the red and infrared portions of the spectrum. One study though, gives a luminosity class of Ia+ which means a hypergiant or extremely luminous supergiant.

Physical properties

A very large and luminous star, VY CMa is among the most extreme stars in the Milky Way and has an effective temperature below . It occupies the upper-right hand corner of the HR diagram although its exact luminosity and temperature are uncertain. Most of the properties of the star depend directly on its distance.

Luminosity
The bolometric luminosity (Lbol) of VY CMa can be calculated from spectral energy distribution or bolometric flux, which can be determined from photometry in several visible and infrared bands. Earlier calculations of the luminosity based on an assumed distance of  gave luminosities between 200,000 and 560,000 times the Sun's luminosity. This is considerably very close or beyond the empirical Humphreys–Davidson limit. More recent estimates of the luminosity extrapolate values below  based on distances below 1.2 kpc.

Many older luminosity estimates are consistent with current ones if they are re-scaled to the distance of 1.2 kpc. Despite being one of the most luminous stars in the Milky Way, much of the visible light of VY CMa is absorbed by the circumstellar envelope, so the star needs a telescope to be observed. Removing its envelope, the star would be one for the naked eye.

Mass
Since this star has no companion star, its mass cannot be measured directly through gravitational interactions. Older studies have found much higher initial masses (thus also higher current masses) or a progenitor mass of  based on old luminosity estimates.

Mass loss

VY CMa has a strong stellar wind and is losing much material due to its high luminosity and quite low surface gravity. It is thus an exponent for the understanding of high-mass loss episodes near the end of massive star evolution. The mass loss rate probably exceeded /yr during the greatest mass loss events.

The star has produced large, probably convection-driven, mass-loss events 70, 120, 200, and 250 years ago. The clump shed by the star between 1985 and 1995 is the source of its hydroxyl maser emission.

Temperature
The effective temperature of this star is uncertain. Some signature changes in its spectrum correspond to temperature variations. Early estimates of the mean temperature assumed values below 3,000 K based on a spectral class of M5. Adopting the latter classes with the temperature scale proposed by Emily Levesque gives a range of between 3,450 and 3,535 K.

Size

The calculation of the radius of VY CMa is complicated by the extensive circumstellar envelope of the star. VY CMa is also a pulsating star, so its size changes with time. However, this is probably larger than the actual size of the underlying star and the angular diameter estimate appears exceedingly large due to interference by the circumstellar envelope.

On 6 and 7 March 2011, VY CMa was observed at near-infrared wavelengths using interferometry at the Very Large Telescope. The high spectral resolution of these observations allowed the effects of contamination by circumstellar layers to be minimised.

Most radius estimates of the VY CMa are considered as the size for the optical photosphere while the size of the star for the radio photosphere is calculated to be twice that of the size of the star for the optical photosphere. Despite the mass and very large size (though some estimates give smaller sizes), VY CMa has an average density of 5.33 to 8.38 mg/m3 (0.00000533 to 0.00000838 kg/m3), it is over 100,000 times less dense than Earth's atmosphere at sea level (1.2 kg/m3).

Largest star

VY Canis Majoris has been known to be an extreme object since the middle of the 20th century, although its true nature was uncertain. In the late 20th century, it was accepted that it was a post-main sequence red supergiant. Its angular diameter had been measured and found to be significantly different depending on the observed wavelength. The first meaningful estimates of its properties showed a very large star.

However, this is probably larger than the actual size of the underlying star—this angular diameter estimate is heightened from interference by the envelope.

On this basis they considered VY CMa and another notable extreme cool hypergiant star, NML Cygni, as normal early-type red supergiants.

In 2011, the star was studied at near-infrared wavelengths using interferometry at the Very Large Telescope. The size of the star was published at its Rosseland Radius, outside of which optical depth falls below , given the mean of two most modern, similar but distinct distances. The high spectral resolution of these observations allowed the effects of contamination by circumstellar layers to be minimised.

Most such radius estimates are considered as the size for the mean limit of the optical photosphere while the size of the star for the radio photosphere is calculated to be twice that. Despite the mass and very large size (though some estimates give smaller sizes), VY CMa has an average density of 5.33 to 8.38 mg/m3 (0.00000533 to 0.00000838 kg/m3). It is over 100,000 times less dense than Earth's atmosphere at sea level (1.2 kg/m3).

In 2012 the size was calculated more accurately to be somewhat lower, for example , which leaves larger sizes published and in-date for other galactic and extragalactic red supergiants (and hypergiants) such as Westerlund 1-26, WOH G64, and Stephenson 2 DFK 1. Despite this, VY Canis Majoris is still often described as the largest known star, sometimes with caveats to account for the highly uncertain sizes of all these stars.

Evolution
VY Canis Majoris is a highly evolved star yet less than 10 million years (Myr) old. Some old writings envisaged the star as a very young protostar or a massive pre-main-sequence star with an age of only 1 Myr and typically a circumstellar disk. The star has evolved rapidly because of its high mass. The time spent to the red hypergiant phase is estimated to be between 100,000 and 500,000 years, and thus VY CMa most likely left its main sequence phase more than a million years ago.

The future evolution of VY CMa is uncertain, but like the most cool supergiants, the star will certainly explode as a supernova. It has begun to fuse helium into carbon en masse. Like Betelgeuse, it is losing mass and is expected to explode as a supernova within the next 100,000 years — it will probably revert to a higher temperature beforehand. The star is very unstable, having a prodigious mass loss such as in ejections.

VY Canis Majoris is a candidate for a star in a second red supergiant phase, but this is mostly speculative and unconfirmed.

From this star CO emission is coincident with the bright KI shell in its asymmetric nebula.

The star will produce either:
 a moderately luminous and long-lasting type IIn supernova (SN IIn)
 a hypernova; or a
 superluminous supernova (SLSN) comparable to SN 1988Z
 or less likely, a type Ib supernova, but it is unlikely that would be as luminous as SN 2006tf or SN 2006gy.

The explosion could be associated with gamma-ray bursts (GRB), and it will produce a shock wave of a speed of a few thousand kilometers per second that could hit the surrounding envelope of material, causing strong emission for many years after the explosion. For a star so large, the remnant would be probably a black hole rather than a neutron star.

Notes

References and footnotes

Further reading

External links

 VLT image of the surroundings of VY Canis Majoris seen with SPHERE www.eso.org
 Astronomers Map a Hypergiant Star's Massive Outbursts, HubbleSite NewsCenter, 2007-01-08
 "What is the Biggest Star in the Universe?", Fraser Cain, Universe Today, published 2008-04-06, updated 13 May 2013

 
 
 Remote Sensing Tutorial Page A-5  archive

M-type hypergiants
M-type supergiants
Canis Major
Canis Majoris, VY
058601
CD-25 4441
035793
Semiregular variable stars
Slow irregular variables
J07225830-2546030
IRAS catalogue objects
TIC objects